At The Kabuki Theatre is a live album by American psychedelic rock band Quicksilver Messenger Service. The last four tracks are taken from studio rehearsal tapes, probably made in 1970 and not in 1969 which is stated on the album cover.

Track listing

CD 1
"Fresh Air" (Jesse Oris Farrow) – 9:55
"New Year's Jam" (Unknown) – 2:45
"Baby, Baby" (Farrow) - 4:27
"Too Far" (David Freiberg) – 3:39
"The Truth" (Dino Valenti) – 7:54
"You're Gonna Need Somebody on Your Band" (Unknown) – 4:07
"Doctor Feelgood" (Curtis Smith) – 5:53
"Cobra" (John Cipollina) – 4:34
"Song for Frisco" (Valenti) – 5:33
"Mona" (Ellas McDaniel) - 9:14
"Subway" (Gary Duncan, Farrow) - 4:55

CD 2
"What About Me" (Farrow) – 6:27
"Call On Me" (Farrow) – 15:29
"Pride of Man" (Hamilton Camp) - 4:21
"Local Colour" (Cipollina) – 3:17
"Not Fade Away" (Charles Hardin, Norman Petty) – 5:32
"Mojo" (Valenti) – 9:27
"Freeway Flyer" (Farrow) – 7:07
"Subway" (Duncan, Farrow) – 1:44
"Castles In The Sand" – 8:31
"Look Over Yonder Wall / State Farm" - 3:50
"Senor Blues" - 6:16

Personnel
 Dino Valenti – vocals, guitar, congas
 John Cipollina - vocals, guitar
 Gary Duncan – vocals, guitar
 David Freiberg – vocals, bass
 Greg Elmore – drums

References

Quicksilver Messenger Service albums
2007 live albums